Christian de la Mazière (22 August 1922 in Tunis – 15 February 2006) was a journalist and member of the Charlemagne Division of the Waffen-SS. He is known for discussing his role in the documentary The Sorrow and the Pity and also wrote a book titled The Captive Dreamer. At the start of the war, he served in the French Army and remained in the military of Vichy France until 1942. After being discharged, he worked for the fascist newspaper Le Pays Libre, joining the Charlemagne Division just before the Liberation of Paris in 1944. He was taken prisoner in Pomerania by Polish forces in the Red Army.

Despite pretending to have served as a forced labourer, he was revealed as a member of the Waffen-SS and after the war was sentenced to prison in 1946. He received a pardon in 1948. He became a talent manager and later worked for the magazine version of Le Figaro and served as an advisor to Togolese military ruler Gnassingbé Eyadéma.

He is believed to be the basis for the character of the same name in Rachel Kushner's novel Telex from Cuba.

Publications
Christian de La Mazière, The Captive Dreamer (Dutton, 1974)
Christian de La Mazière, Ashes of Honour (Wingate, 1975)

References

1922 births
2006 deaths
French Waffen-SS personnel
French male non-fiction writers
People from Tunis
French expatriates in Togo
20th-century French journalists
Pardon recipients
20th-century French male writers
Le Figaro people